"Sleep Safe and Warm", also simply called "Lullaby from Rosemary's Baby", is a musical composition by Krzysztof Komeda, written for Roman Polanski's 1968 American psychological horror film Rosemary's Baby. In the original version, vocals were performed by Mia Farrow, who also played the lead role in the movie.

Release

Different versions 
Excluding many variations, two main versions of the composition can be found on the original soundtrack album. Both of them serves as an opener of their respective sides of the record and both of them features Mia Farrow singing the lead part. The first version is a George Tipton’s easy listening arrangement called "Lullaby, Part 1", released later (along with "Lullaby, Part 2" on the B-side) as a single record, while the second one on the album is the original Komeda's film version arrangement, named there "Main Title (Vocal)".

George Tipton's arrangement with Farrow's vocals reached No. 33 on the American Billboard Easy Listening chart.

Unused lyrics 
Though not used in the film in any form, the lyrics for "Sleep Safe and Warm", written by Larry Kusik and Eddie Snyder were released with the official sheet music release. Claudine Longet is, for example, among very few artists to include them in their records. The lyrics for the composition are running as follow:
Sleep safe and warm. 
From my arms no power can take you.
Sleep safe and warm.
Till my morning kisses awake you.
In the softness of the night,
Like a silver colored kite,
All your fears will fly and disappear
By morning's light.

Loving you as I love you,
Ev'ry night your whole life through,
I'll be gently watching over you
Sleep safe and warm.

Charts

Weekly charts

Legacy 
The "Lullaby from Rosemary's Baby" has been covered by many musicians, including Chet Atkins, Claudine Longet, Leszek Możdżer, Emmanuelle Seigner and Tomasz Stańko. A heavy metal cover of the song was done by the band Fantômas on their album The Director's Cut in 2001.

References 

1968 songs
Songs written for films
Songs written by Eddie Snyder
Songs with lyrics by Larry Kusik